Ähtärinjärvi is a lake in Finland. It is situated in the municipalities of Ähtäri, Alajärvi (formerly Lehtimäki) and Soini in the Southern Ostrobothnia region in western Finland. The lake is part of the Kokemäenjoki basin and drains through a chain of lakes that includes among others the lakes Toisvesi and Tarjanne in the Pirkanmaa region, where the lake Tarjanne in its turn drains into the Lake Ruovesi.

See also
List of lakes in Finland

References
 Seppä, Heikki & Matti Tikkanen: Land uplift-driven shift of the outlet of Lake Ähtärinjärvi, western Finland. Bulletin of the Geological Society of Finland, Vol. 78. Helsinki: the Geological Society of Finland, 2006.

Kokemäenjoki basin
Lakes of Ähtäri
Lakes of Alajärvi